In mathematics, a Walsh matrix is a specific square matrix of dimensions 2, where n is some particular natural number. The entries of the matrix are either +1 or −1 and its rows as well as columns are orthogonal, i.e. dot product is zero. The Walsh matrix was proposed by Joseph L. Walsh in 1923.  Each row of a Walsh matrix corresponds to a Walsh function.

The Walsh matrices are a special case of Hadamard matrices. The naturally ordered Hadamard matrix is defined by the recursive formula below, and the sequency-ordered Hadamard matrix is formed by rearranging the rows so that the number of sign changes in a row is in increasing order. Confusingly, different sources refer to either matrix as the Walsh matrix.

The Walsh matrix (and Walsh functions) are used in computing the Walsh transform and have applications in the efficient implementation of certain signal processing operations.

Formula
The Hadamard matrices of dimension 2k for k ∈ N are given by the recursive formula (the lowest order of Hadamard matrix is 2):
 

and in general

for 2 ≤ k ∈ N, where ⊗ denotes the Kronecker product.

Permutation
Rearrange the rows of the matrix according to the number of sign change of each row. For example, in

the successive rows have 0, 3, 1, and 2 sign changes. If we rearrange the rows in sequency ordering:

then the successive rows have 0, 1, 2, and 3 sign changes.

Alternative forms of the Walsh matrix

Sequency ordering
The sequency ordering of the rows of the Walsh matrix can be derived from the ordering of the Hadamard matrix by first applying the bit-reversal permutation and then the Gray-code permutation:

where the successive rows have 0, 1, 2, 3, 4, 5, 6, and 7 sign changes.

Dyadic ordering

where the successive rows have 0, 1, 3, 2, 7, 6, 4, and 5 sign changes.

Natural ordering

where the successive rows have 0, 7, 3, 4, 1, 6, 2, and 5 sign changes.

See also 

 Haar wavelet
 Quincunx matrix
 Hadamard transform
 Code-division multiple access
  – rows of the (negated) binary Walsh matrices read as reverse binary numbers
  – antidiagonals of the negated binary Walsh matrix read as binary numbers

References

Matrices

de:Hadamard-Matrix#Walsh-Matrizen